Diamand Bou Abooud is a Lebanese actress, working in Europe and the Arab world, specifically Lebanon and Egypt.

Early life and education 
Diamand Bou Abboud studied drama at the Lebanese University's Institute of Fine Arts, Department of Theater, Cinema & Television.

Career
Diamand Bou Abboud began her career in 2001 after being cast in the period TV series, The Search for Saladin. She appeared in several Lebanese movies and series, including helmer Samir Habchi's Beirut Open City and the Pan-Arab hit drama, Ruby, starring Amir Karara, Cyrine Abdelnour, Maxim Khalil, and directed by Rami Hanna. In 2013, she joined an all-star cast in Mahmoud Hojeij's Stable Unstable, playing the role of Anna, for which she won the Murex d'Or.

Bou Abboud came into international prominence after starring in Ziad Doueiri's The Insult, which screened in the main competition section of the 74th Venice International Film Festival and was selected as the Lebanese entry for the Best Foreign Language Film, after which the film was nominated for the Oscar at the 90th Academy Awards.

In 2017, she starred, alongside Hiam Abbass, in Belgian director, Philippe Van Leeuw's film In Syria.

In 2019, Bou Abboud starred in Eden, a European series directed by French filmmaker Dominik Moll.

Bou Abboud starred in Shahid's hit series The Fixer in 2020 
and also starred in Netflix's first Arabic original feature, an all-star adaptation of Italian box office hit Perfect Strangers.

In 2022, she starred alongside Egyptian actresses Menna Shalabi and Elham Shahin in Shahid's Ramadan series, Bitlou' Al Rouh, which was directed by Kamla Abou Zekry

Personal life
Bou Abooud is married to Egyptian singer and actor Hany Adel.

Filmography

Film

Television
{| class="wikitable plainrowheaders sortable" style="margin-right: 0;"
|-
! Year !! Title !! Role !! Director !! Notes
|-
|rowspan=1|2022
|| Bi Tlou' el Rouh || ||Kamla Abou Zekry ||Streamed on Shahid
|-
|rowspan=1|2021
|| Amnesia || ||Rodney Haddad||
|-
|rowspan=3|2020
|| Fixer ||Sarah ||Mark Eid||Streamed on Shahid
|- 
|| Beirut 6:07 || || ||Streamed on Shahid
|- 
|| The Sculptor || ||Majdi Smiri||
|- 
|rowspan=1|2019
|| Eden ||Maryam ||Dominik Moll||European production
|- 
|rowspan=1|2018
|| Renegades ||Habiba||Mahmoud Kamel||
|- 
|rowspan=2|2015
|| Innocent, but... ||Amal ||Charbel Shedid and Samir Habchi||
|- 
|| Shahbandar's Daughter || Hind||HWael Abo-Shaar anddSeif El-Dinne Al Soubai||
|- 
|rowspan=1|2013
|| Zaffe: Parade || ||Hani Khashfeh||
|- 
|rowspan=1|2012
|| Ruby ||Sherine||Rami Hanna||Aired on MBC 4
|- 
|rowspan=1|2001
|| The Search for Saladdin' ||||Najdat Esmail Anzur	& Mohamed Zuhair Ragabl||
|- 
|}

Accolades 

Diamand Bou Abboud won best actress prize at the Lebanese Movie Awards as well as a Murex d’Or for best actress for her role in the 2013 film, Void''.

References

External links
 

Living people
Lebanese television actresses
Lebanese film actresses
Year of birth missing (living people)
21st-century Lebanese actresses